Call avoidance is a strategy businesses use to reduce inbound call volumes to contact centers in the customer service industry, particularly in the consumer market.

Basis
Businesses choose call avoidance techniques because person-to-person service calls are time-consuming and costly and should be accessed only when there is no viable option. Voice calls can then be reserved for high priority customers, complex service requests, or emergency situations where the quick response of skilled phone agents is essential.

Concerns
It is impractical and expensive for call centers to provide a live answer for every caller during peak demand periods such as certain times of the day, days of the week, or seasons. Callers in urgent need to discuss an issue with a live person are typically put on hold along with callers whose request could be better served through other channels. Both are competing for valuable talk time.

Strategies
With the spread of the Internet and email access, contact centers are moving toward self services via a searchable knowledgebase, Interactive Voice Response (IVR), or computer generated emails. Password resets are the most popular form of website self-service where clients are asked pre-established confidential questions that verify credentials before the system sends them a temporary password. Other typical areas to employ call avoidance strategies include the following:
Voice message indicating wait times, unusual activity, downtime, etc.
Web forms that gather pertinent information before a call is answered
Electronic chat via the Internet
Online software update notices of upgrades to prevent security or virus breaches
Blogs, Frequently Asked Questions (FAQ), web site links to common problems
Simpler, clear and concise product documentation and descriptions
Automatic return policies and procedures
Reports that identify key problem areas for corrective action, i.e., additional instruction/training

References

 Last, Rober S.; "Please Don’t Call Us: Building a Customer-friendly Call Avoidance Strategy for the Support Center", Help Desk Institute Newsletter, November/December 2007
 Contact Babel; Getting Call Avoidance Right, A White Paper August, 2007

See also

 Call centre
 Help desk
 Helpdesk and incident reporting auditing
 Incident tracking system
 Service desk (ITSM)
 Technical support
 Customer service
 Virtual assistance (in German)

Telemarketing